The Electoral district of Maryborough and Talbot was an electorate of the Victorian Legislative Assembly from 1877.

The 1876 Electoral Act Amendment Act (taking effect at the 1877 elections) defined the district as: 

The 1888 Electoral Amendment Act abolished Maryborough and Talbot (taking effect at the 1889 elections) and split it into Maryborough and Talbot and Avoca.

Members for Maryborough and Talbot

See also
 Parliaments of the Australian states and territories
 List of members of the Victorian Legislative Assembly

References

Former electoral districts of Victoria (Australia)
1877 establishments in Australia
1889 disestablishments in Australia